The War Crimes Act 1991 is an Act of the Parliament of the United Kingdom. It confers jurisdiction on courts in the United Kingdom to try people for war crimes committed in Nazi Germany or German-occupied territory during the Second World War by people who were not British citizens at the time, but have since become British citizens or residents. The legislation was enacted since there were no provisions to allow the extradition of British residents or naturalised citizens to face trial for war crimes in third countries at the time. Other countries, such as the United States, have used civil rather than criminal proceedings to resolve this issue by revoking citizenship of suspects, therefore facilitating their deportation.

The Act was rejected by the House of Lords, and so it was passed with the authority of only the House of Commons under the provisions of the Parliament Acts 1911 and 1949. The Parliament Acts are rarely invoked: the War Crimes Act was only the fourth statute since 1911 enacted under their provisions, and the first since the Parliament Act 1949. The War Crimes Act remains the only time that the Parliament Acts were invoked by a Conservative government.

To date only one person, Anthony Sawoniuk, has been convicted under the Act. In 1999, he was sentenced to life imprisonment for murder during his involvement with the collaborationist Belarusian Auxiliary Police. He died in jail in 2005.

The first person to be charged, however, was fellow Belarusian officer, Szymon Serafinowicz Sr. (the grandfather of the British actor actor Peter Serafinowicz. His trial commenced in 1997 for the murder of three unnamed Jews committed as during his role as Police chief in Mir. At this stage, he was in the advanced stages of dementia and was declared medically unfit. He died later that year.

References

External links

Law of war
War crimes
United Kingdom Acts of Parliament 1991
English criminal law
1991 in military history
Acts of the Parliament of the United Kingdom passed under the Parliament Act
Ex post facto law